Slaviša "Slavko" Koprivica (born 17 June 1968) is a retired Serbian professional basketball player. He played at both the power forward and center positions.

Professional career
While playing with Partizan Belgrade, Koprivica won the EuroLeague championship, in 1992.

Personal life 
Koprivica's son Balša (born 2000), played high school basketball in the United States. Balša won the 2017 FIBA Europe Under-18 Championship, and he was considered to be one of the top ten college recruits in the Class of 2019.

Koprivica and Miroslav Pecarski played together on the junior Yugoslav national team, and they won a gold medal at the 1987 FIBA Under-19 World Cup. Thirty years later, their sons Balša Koprivica and Marko Pecarski, played together for Serbia's junior national team; and they won a gold medal at the 2017 FIBA Europe Under-18 Championship.

References

External links
 FIBA Europe profile
 Legabasket profile
 Polish League profile

1968 births
Living people
Centers (basketball)
KK Beobanka players
KK IMT Beograd players
KK Partizan players
KK Superfund players
OKK Beograd players
Pagrati B.C. players
Power forwards (basketball)
Serbian expatriate basketball people in Bulgaria
Serbian expatriate basketball people in Greece
Serbian expatriate basketball people in Hungary
Serbian expatriate basketball people in Italy
Serbian expatriate basketball people in Poland
Serbian expatriate basketball people in Russia
Serbian men's basketball players
Basketball players from Belgrade
Szolnoki Olaj KK players
Yugoslav men's basketball players